Subtiliolithus is an oogenus of fossil egg from the Nemegt Formation of Mongolia and the Ohyamashimo Formation of Japan. The eggs are notable for a very thin eggshell. It contains three oospecies: S. hyogoensis, S. kachchhensis and S. microtuberculatus. They were originally classified as a distinct oofamily, Subtiliolithidae, but numerous similarities to Laevisoolithus have led to their reclassification as Laevisoolithid eggs. A complete skeleton of Nanantius valifanovi was found associated with Subtiliolithus eggshells, indicating that the oogenus represents eggs of enantiornithine birds.

References

Egg fossils
Fossils of Mongolia
Maastrichtian life
Nemegt Formation
Fossil parataxa described in 1991